Flowing may refer to:
 Fluid dynamics, a subdiscipline of fluid mechanics
 Flowing Township, Clay County, Minnesota
 Flowing (film), a 1956 Japanese drama film 
 "Flowing" (song), song by 311, 1992

See also 
 Flow (disambiguation)